Ferdinand II (12 January 1810 –  22 May 1859) was King of the Two Sicilies from 1830 until his death in 1859.

Family
Ferdinand was born in Palermo to King Francis I of the Two Sicilies and his wife Maria Isabella of Spain. His paternal grandparents were King Ferdinand I of the Two Sicilies and Queen Maria Carolina of Austria. His maternal grandparents were Charles IV of Spain and Maria Luisa of Parma. Ferdinand I and Charles IV were brothers, both sons of Charles III of Spain and Maria Amalia of Saxony. Among his siblings were: Teresa Cristina, Empress of Brazil, wife of the last Brazilian emperor Pedro II.

Early reign

In his early years he was fairly popular. Progressives credited him with Liberal ideas and, in addition, his free and easy manners endeared him to the so-called lazzaroni, the lower classes of Neapolitan society.

On succeeding to the throne in 1830, he published an edict in which he promised to give his most anxious attention to the impartial administration of justice, to reform the finances, and to use every effort to heal the wounds which had afflicted the Kingdom for so many years. His goal, he said, was to govern his Kingdom in a way that would bring the greatest happiness to the greatest number of his subjects while respecting the rights of his fellow monarchs and those of the Roman Catholic Church.

The early years of his reign were comparatively peaceful: he cut taxes and expenditures, had the first railway in Italy built (between Naples and the royal palace at Portici), his fleet had the first steamship in the Italian Peninsula and he had telegraphic connections established between Naples and Palermo, Sicily.

However, in 1837, he violently suppressed Sicilian demonstrators demanding a constitution and maintained strict police surveillance in his domains. Progressive international, who were motivated by visions of a new society founded upon a modern constitution, continued to demand that the King grant a constitution and liberalize his rule.

Revolutions of 1848

In September 1847, violent riots inspired by Liberals broke out in Reggio Calabria and in Messina, which were put down by the military. On 12 January 1848 a rising in Palermo spread throughout the island and served as a spark for the Revolutions of 1848 all over Europe.

After similar revolutionary outbursts in Salerno, south of Naples, and in the Cilento region which were backed by the majority of the intelligentsia of the Kingdom, on 29 January 1848 King Ferdinand was forced to grant a constitution patterned on the French Charter of 1830.

A dispute, however, arose as to the nature of the oath which should be taken by the members of the chamber of deputies. As an agreement could not be reached and the King refused to compromise, riots continued in the streets. Eventually, the King ordered the army to break them and dissolved the national parliament on 13 March 1849. Although the constitution was never formally abrogated, the King returned to reigning as an absolute monarch.

During this period, Ferdinand showed his attachment to Pope Pius IX by granting him asylum at Gaeta. The Pope had been temporarily forced to flee from Rome following similar revolutionary disturbances.

In the meantime, Sicily proclaimed its independence under the leadership of Ruggero Settimo, who on 13 April 1848 declared the King deposed. In response, the King assembled an army of 20,000 under the command of General Carlo Filangieri and dispatched it to Sicily to subdue the Liberals and restore his authority. A naval flotilla sent to Sicilian waters shelled the city of Messina with "savage barbarity" for eight hours after its defenders had already surrendered, killing many civilians and earning the King the nickname re bomba ("King Bomb").

After a campaign lasting close to nine months, Sicily's Liberal regime was completely subdued on 15 May 1849.

Later reign

Between 1848 and 1851, the policies of King Ferdinand caused many to go into exile. Meanwhile, an estimated 2,000 suspected revolutionaries or dissidents were jailed.

After visiting Naples in 1850, Gladstone began to support Neapolitan opponents of the Bourbon rulers: his "support" consisted of a couple of letters that he sent from Naples to Parliament in London, describing the "awful conditions" of the Kingdom of Southern Italy and claiming that "it is the negation of God erected into a system of government". Gladstone's letters provoked sensitive reactions in the whole of Europe and helped to cause the kingdom's diplomatic isolation prior to the invasion and annexation of the Kingdom of the Two Sicilies by the Kingdom of Sardinia, with the subsequent foundation of modern Italy.

The British government, which had been the ally and protector of the Bourbon dynasty during the Napoleonic Wars, had already additional interests in limiting the independence of the kingdom. It had extensive business interests in Sicily and relied on Sicilian sulphur for certain industries. The King had endeavoured to limit British influence, which had begun to cause tension. As Ferdinand ignored the advice of the British and French governments, those powers recalled their ambassadors in 1856.

A soldier attempted to assassinate Ferdinand in 1856, and many believe that the infection he received from the soldier's bayonet led to his ultimate demise. He died on 22 May 1859, shortly after the Second French Empire and the Kingdom of Sardinia had declared war against the Austrian Empire. This would later lead to the invasion of his Kingdom by Giuseppe Garibaldi and Italian unification in 1861.

Honours

Issue

Ancestry

See also
Naples–Portici railway line

Notes

External links

 

1810 births
1859 deaths
Nobility from Palermo
Princes of Bourbon-Two Sicilies
Monarchs of the Kingdom of the Two Sicilies
People of the Revolutions of 1848
Pope Pius IX
Burials at the Basilica of Santa Chiara
19th-century Roman Catholics
Italian Roman Catholics
Grand Crosses of the Order of Saint Stephen of Hungary
Knights of the Golden Fleece of Spain